Sarfaraz Khan Niazi (Urdu: سرفراز خان نیازی; born 1949 in Lucknow, India) he migrated to Karachi, Pakistan in 1962, and to the United States in 1970. He is an expert in biopharmaceutical manufacturing and has worked in academia, industry, and as an entrepreneur. He has written books in pharmaceutical sciences, biotechnology, consumer healthcare, and poetry. He has translated ghazals (love poems) of the Urdu poet Ghalib.

Personal life 
Niazi was born on 10 July 1949 in Lucknow in India, and moved to Karachi with his parents in 1962. His father was Niaz Fatehpuri, a scholar of religion and literature in Pakistan and India.

Education 
Niazi earned a Bachelor of Science degree in pharmacy from the University of Karachi in 1969. In 1970, he moved to the United States, where he obtained his Master of Science degree in pharmaceutical sciences in 1971 from Washington State University in Pullman, WA, and then moved to Illinois. In 1974, he obtained his doctorate in pharmaceutical sciences from the University of Illinois at Chicago.

Employment 
From 1972 to 1988, he taught at the College of Pharmacy at the University of Illinois at Chicago, and continues to serve as Adjunct Professor of Biopharmaceutical Sciences. From 1988 to 1996, he worked for Abbott Laboratories as its director of technical affairs; at the same time, he was a professor of pharmacology at the Aga Khan University Hospital in Karachi. In 1997, he established his own consulting business, known as Pharmaceutical Scientist, Inc. In 2003, he founded Therapeutic Proteins, Inc. to develop biosimilar versions of biopharmaceuticals, such as filgrastim, erythropoietin, interferon, Pegfilgrastim, adalimumab, and other monoclonal antibodies. In March 2012, this company became Therapeutic Proteins International, LLC. The company has proprietary single-use bioreactor systems. In November 2016, the company changed its name to Adello Biologics.; in January 2019, Adello Biologics assets were purchased by Kashiv Bioscience.

Honorary teaching 
Since 2012, he has served as an adjunct professor at the College of Pharmacy, University of Illinois, and since 2004 he has served as an adjunct professor at the University of Houston College of Pharmacy. In 2007, he was named as an adjunct professor at the HEJ Research Institute of Chemistry at the University of Karachi. Additionally, since 2013 he has been an NUST Visiting Professor at the National University of Sciences and Technology (NUST) in Islamabad, Pakistan.

Poetry 
In 2002, Niazi published the first complete translation of the ghazals of Mirza Asadullah Baig Khan, known as "Ghalib" and another in 2009. In 2023, Niazi published the first complete English translation of Ghalib's Persian love poems with Mariam Tawoosi Niazi had hosted a show on Voice of America every Sunday, where he would recite ghazals.

Research 
Niazi has published over 100 research articles, and is the creator of a variable volume distribution model to study the safety and efficacy of drugs.

Biosimilars 
Niazi has shared his knowledge in several publications in the field of biosimilars. He has published multiple books      on the subject and peer-reviewed research papers    that advise developers on how to secure a faster approval of biosimilars by the FDA and EMA and suggest changes to harmonize approval guidelines. He has also introduced the concept of biosimilar mRNA vaccines. He has also created biosimilar whiskies

Politics 
Niazi has recently challenged the Biosimilars Council, disreputing the Congressional Bill intended to reduce the cost of drugs to Medicare patients as a price control measure that will hurt the industry. In a line-by-line analysis in a peer-reviewed journal, Niazi stated that these oppositions are merely political as all Republicans opposed the Bill.

FDA/WHO 
Niazi has challenged FDA guidance through three Citizen Petitions that urge the FDA to rationalize testing to allow faster entry of generic drugs and biosimilars to the market. In response to Niazi's Citizen Petition, the FDA withdrew pivotal guidance for approving biosimilars. Niazi has also challenged the World Health Organization's guidance on approving biosimilars as weak on science leading to the possibility of the use of unsafe biological drugs in developing countries.He has suggested harmonizing the guidelines for approval of biosimilars removing the animal and phase 3 studies that will significantly reduce the cost of biosimilars. Niazi also contributed to Senate Bill introduced by Senator Lee recognizing his recommendations to remove the interchangeability status of biosimilars. The FDA has awarded a grant of $2 million to Niazi working with Professor Anna Schwendeman to develop new analytical technologies to reduce the testing of biosimilars and remove clinical efficacy testing.

Animal Rights 
Niazi has strongly opposed animal testing of biosimilars in the prestigious Science magazine; he has also referred to the new FDA perspective that even new biological drugs need not be tested in animals, all because animals do not have the receptors for the biological drugs to bind and thus show pharmacology or toxicology.Niazi assisted US Senate in the drafting of the FDA Modernization Act 2.0, convincing the Senators to remove animal testing of generic and biological drugs; it became law in 2023

Inventions 
Niazi owns 177 patents in the field of bioprocessing, digital technology, new drugs, new dosage forms, and herbal medicines. Niazi is also a patent law practitioner.

Awards 
On 14 August 2012, the Government of Pakistan announced that President Asif Ali Zardari would be awarded the Sitara-i-Imtiaz in Engineering Science to Sarfaraz.
In March 2015, he received the Alum of the Year Award from the University of Illinois. In September 2015, he was inducted into the Chicago Entrepreneur Hall of Fame.

Textbooks and professional handbooks 
Niazi has published dozens of books; His textbooks are generally made available royalty-free in the developing world.
 Handbook of Biogeneric Therapeutic Proteins: Regulatory, Manufacturing, Testing, and Patent Issues. Boca Raton, Florida: CRC, 2002. .
 Textbook of Clinical Pharmacokinetics and Biopharmaceutics. Bsp, India. 2010. .
 Handbook of Bioequivalence Testing. Boca Raton, Florida: CRC, 2014. .
 Biosimilar and Interchangeable Biologics: From Cell Line to Commercial Launch, Two Volume Set 1st Edition. Boca Raton, Florida: CRC, CRC, 2015. .
 Fundamentals of Bioprocess Engineering. Boca Raton, Florida: CRC, FL. 2015 
 Love Sonnets of Ghalib. Rupa Publications, New Delhi, India, 2017. .
 Biosimilarlity—The FDA Perspective. Boca Raton, Florida: CRC, 2018. .
 Handbook of Pharmaceutical Manufacturing Formulations Volumes 1–6. Boca Raton, Florida: CRC, 2019. .
 Handbook of Preformulation: Drugs, Botanicals, and Biological Pharmaceutical Products. Second edition. Boca Raton, Florida: CRC, 2019. .
 Future of Pharmaceuticals. A Nonlinear Analysis. Boca Raton, Florida: CRC, 2022. .
 mRNA Therapeutics--A Fast to Market Strategy. CRC Press, Boca Raton, Florida. 
 Biopharmaceutical Manufacturing, Volume 1 Regulatory processes. Professor Sarfaraz K. Niazi, Sunitha Lokesh. Bristol, UK 2021. .
 Biopharmaceutical Manufacturing, Volume 2 Unit Operations. Professor Sarfaraz K. Niazi, Sunitha Lokesh. Bristol, UK 2021. .
 Wine of Love, Persian Ghazals of Ghalib, Translations, and Explications by Sarfaraz Niazi and Maryam Tawoosi Ghalib Academy of America .

References

External links 
 

Pakistani translators
Pakistani writers
People from Karachi
1949 births
Living people
Recipients of Sitara-i-Imtiaz
Indian emigrants to Pakistan
Pakistani emigrants to the United States
American people of Pakistani descent
American businesspeople
University of Karachi alumni
Academic staff of Aga Khan University
Academic staff of the National University of Sciences & Technology
Pakistani pharmacists
People from Lucknow
Scientists from Chicago